Baeria is an unaccepted scientific name and may refer to two different genera:
 Lasthenia,  genus of flowers
 Leuconia, a genus of sea sponges

See also
 Baiera